1922 in sports describes the year's events in world sport.

American football
NFL championship
 Canton Bulldogs wins the APFA (NFL) title with a record of 10 wins, 0 losses and 2 ties.

College championship
 Cornell Big Red – college football national championship

Events
 24 June — the American Professional Football Association renames itself as the National Football League.

Association football
England
 The Football League – Liverpool 57 points, Tottenham Hotspur 51, Burnley 49, Cardiff City 48, Aston Villa 47, Bolton Wanderers 47
 FA Cup Final – Huddersfield Town 1–0 Preston North End at Stamford Bridge, London
Germany
 National Championship – no decision after Hamburger SV and 1. FC Nürnberg played two drawn games
Russia
 Spartak Moscow, as known well for former Soviet Union, officially founded on April 18.

Athletics
Monaco
 second Women's Olympiad in Monte Carlo
France
 the first Women's World Games, Paris

Australian rules football
VFL Premiership
 14 October – Fitzroy wins the 26th VFL Premiership, defeating Collingwood 11.13 (79) to 9.14 (68) at Melbourne Cricket Ground (MCG) in the 1922 VFL Grand Final.
South Australian Football League
 30 September – Norwood 9.7 (61) defeat West Adelaide 2.16 (28) to win their fifteenth SAFL premiership.
 Magarey Medal won by Robert Barnes (West Adelaide)
West Australian Football League
 23 September – East Perth 7.13 (55) beat West Perth 5.9 (39) to win their fourth successive premiership
 Sandover Medal won by Harold Boyd (West Perth)

Bandy
Sweden
 Championship final – IK Sirius 3-2 Västerås SK

Baseball
World Series
 4–8 October — New York Giants (NL) defeats New York Yankees (AL) to win the 1922 World Series by 4 games to 0 with one tie
Negro leagues
 The Chicago American Giants win their third consecutive Negro National League pennant.

Boxing
Events
 10 July — Joe Lynch regains the World Bantamweight Championship when he defeats Johnny Buff with a 14th-round technical knockout in New York
 24 September — Battling Siki captures the World Light Heavyweight Championship when he knocks out Georges Carpentier in the 6th round in Paris.
 1 November — Mickey Walker, one of the greatest boxing champions, wins his first world title when he defeats World Welterweight Champion Jack Britton over 15 rounds in New York
Lineal world champions
 World Heavyweight Championship – Jack Dempsey
 World Light Heavyweight Championship – Georges Carpentier → Battling Siki
 World Middleweight Championship – Johnny Wilson
 World Welterweight Championship – Jack Britton → Mickey Walker
 World Lightweight Championship – Benny Leonard
 World Featherweight Championship – Johnny Kilbane
 World Bantamweight Championship – Johnny Buff → Joe Lynch
 World Flyweight Championship – Jimmy Wilde

Canadian football
Grey Cup
 10th Grey Cup in the Canadian Football League – Queen's University 13–1 Edmonton Elks

Cricket
Events
 Yorkshire recovers the County Championship to begin a run of four successive titles.
England
 County Championship – Yorkshire
 Minor Counties Championship – Buckinghamshire
 Most runs – Jack Russell 2575 @ 54.78 (HS 172)
 Most wickets – Charlie Parker 206 @ 13.16 (BB 9–36)
 Wisden Cricketers of the Year – Arthur Carr, Tich Freeman, Charlie Parker, Jack Russell, Andy Sandham
Australia
 Sheffield Shield – Victoria
 Most runs – Frank O'Keeffe 708 @ 118.00 (HS 180)
 Most wickets – Ted McDonald 28 @ 21.50 (BB 8–84)
India
 Bombay Quadrangular – Europeans
New Zealand
 Plunket Shield – Auckland
South Africa
 Currie Cup – Transvaal
West Indies
 Inter-Colonial Tournament – Barbados

Cycling
Tour de France
 Firmin Lambot (Belgium) wins the 16th Tour de France
Events
 17 September — Dutch cyclist Piet Moeskops becomes World Champion in the UCI Track Cycling World Championships - Men's Sprint.

Figure skating
World Figure Skating Championships
 World Men's Champion – Gillis Grafström (Sweden)
 World Women's Champion – Herma Szabo (Austria)
 World Pairs Champions – Helene Engelmann and Alfred Berger (Austria)

Golf
Major tournaments
 British Open – Walter Hagen
 US Open – Gene Sarazen
 USPGA Championship – Gene Sarazen
Other tournaments
 British Amateur – Ernest Holderness
 US Amateur – Jess Sweetser

Horse racing
England
 Grand National – Music Hall
 1,000 Guineas Stakes – Silver Urn
 2,000 Guineas Stakes – St Louis
 The Derby – Captain Cuttle
 The Oaks – Pogrom
 St. Leger Stakes – Royal Lancer
Australia
 Melbourne Cup – King Ingoda
Canada
 King's Plate – South Shore
France
 Prix de l'Arc de Triomphe – Ksar (second successive victory)
Ireland
 Irish Grand National – Halston
 Irish Derby Stakes – Spike Island 
USA
 Kentucky Derby – Morvich
 Preakness Stakes – Pillory
 Belmont Stakes – Pillory

Ice hockey
Stanley Cup
 17–28 March — Toronto St. Pats defeats Vancouver Millionaires in the 1922 Stanley Cup Finals by 3 games to 2

Motorsport

Rowing
The Boat Race
 1 April — Cambridge wins the 74th Oxford and Cambridge Boat Race

Rugby league
England
 Championship – Wigan
 Challenge Cup final – Rochdale Hornets 10–9 Hull F.C. at Headingley Rugby Stadium, Leeds
 Lancashire League Championship – Oldham
 Yorkshire League Championship – Huddersfield
 Lancashire County Cup – Warrington 7–5 Oldham
 Yorkshire County Cup – Leeds 11–3 Dewsbury
Australia
 NSW Premiership – North Sydney 35–3 Glebe (grand final)

Rugby union
Five Nations Championship
 35th Five Nations Championship series is won by Wales

Speed skating
Speed Skating World Championships
 Men's All-round Champion – Harald Strøm (Norway)

Swimming
Events
 Johnny Weissmuller swims the 100 metres freestyle in 58.6 seconds to create a world record and break the "minute barrier"

Tennis
Events
 Inaugural Australian Women's Singles Championship is held.
Australia
 Australian Men's Singles Championship – James Anderson (Australia) defeats Gerald Patterson (Australia) 6–0 3–6 3–6 6–3 6–2
 Australian Women's Singles Championship – Margaret Molesworth (Australia) defeats Esna Boyd Robertson (Australia) 6–3 10–8
England
 Wimbledon Men's Singles Championship – Gerald Patterson (Australia) defeats Randolph Lycett (Great Britain) 6–3 6–4 6–2
 Wimbledon Women's Singles Championship – Suzanne Lenglen (France) defeats Molla Bjurstedt Mallory (Norway) 6–2 6–0
France
 French Men's Singles Championship – Henri Cochet (France) defeats Jean Samazeuilh (France) 8–6 6–3 7–5
 French Women's Singles Championship – Suzanne Lenglen (France) defeats Germaine Golding (France) 6–4 6–2 
USA
 American Men's Singles Championship – Bill Tilden (USA) defeats Bill Johnston (USA) 4–6 3–6 6–2 6–3 6–4
 American Women's Singles Championship – Molla Bjurstedt Mallory (Norway) defeats Helen Wills Moody (USA) 6–3 6–1
Davis Cup
 1922 International Lawn Tennis Challenge –  4–1  at West Side Tennis Club (grass) New York City, United States

Water skiing
Events
 Water skiing invented in Lake City, Minnesota by Ralph Samuelson

References

 
Sports by year